Jiangmen Star Park is a celebrity park opened in November 2010 in Jiangmen, Guangdong, China at an estimated cost of 10 million yuan.

Theme
The theme of the park is based on notable celebrities with specific ancestral roots from the Greater Taishan Region of Taishan, Kaiping, Xinhui & Jiangmen, Enping, Heshan.  The list is quite long with about 120 celebrities. The following are some notable people from within a particular district of the same city.

Others include: Kenny Bee, Bobby Au-Yeung, Patrick Tam, Jamie Chik.  So far Yi Jianlian is the only person not to be from the TV-film-music entertainment industry.  He is a basketball player.

Opening
Throughout the year in 2010 many hand prints of celebrities were collected.  In the afternoon of November 6, 2010 an official opening ceremony was held at the park with many in attendance including Andy Lau, Tony Leung, Eric Tsang, Maggie Cheung Ho-yee, Xia Yu, Kiki Sheung, Gillian Cheung and many others.  A large night celebration concert was held at the Five Counties cultural center and televised by TVB to Hong Kong in an event called "Stars shine over Jiangmen".  Main performers include Gigi Leung, Jenny Tseng, Wong Ka Keung, Joey Yung, Andy Lau, Gillian Cheung and members from The Voice.  Others in attendance include the Chief Executive of Macau Fernando Chui and a crowd of about 15,000 at the square.

References

Jiangmen
Tourist attractions in Guangdong